The Melville Comprehensive School is a public school in Melville, Saskatchewan, Canada. Approximately 450 students from grades 7 - 12 attend the school. The Melville Comprehensive School is part of and is run by the Good Spirit School Division. Their nickname is the "Cobras". School colours are purple, white, and black.

Sports
The Melville Comprehensive School offers eight different sports including basketball, volleyball, football, badminton, golf, track and field, cross country running, and curling. There are teams for both junior and senior high students, and both girls and boys participate.

Clubs
At MCS there are a variety of clubs ranging from: Students Against Drinking and Driving (SADD); scrapbooking club; digital media club; drama club; debate club; and yearbook. The local SADD has won numerous awards for being the Most Active SADD Chapter in the province.

Student Representative Government
Melville Comprehensive School has a group called the Student Representative Government (SRG) that controls what goes on in the school. It is run by students with the help of some staff members. They plan and organize many school functions and activities with the aim of improving student life and making the school as fun and enjoyable as possible. Some of these events they plan include school dances, spirit days, assemblies, and guest speakers. They also discuss school problems or things that the school is doing and try to make them better. The SRG is run by a President and a Vice President. The students and staff meet every Monday morning at 8am for meetings.

Music
Band is offered to anyone in grade 7-12. Grade 10, 11, and 12 students form the senior band while the other grades create three junior bands. The bands perform at least three times a year and may even go on band trips. All bands perform in the annual Christmas Concert at the school as well as the Year End Concert. The bands also perform in Regina during the spring. Grades 7's go to Peace Gardens (which is on the border of Manitoba and United States.) Grade 9's and sometimes 8's go to Minneapolis. The Senior band goes different places every year or two. Besides band, MCS also offers Senior Choir, which takes place first period the first semester of school. The Music Department also offers out of class groups like our Senior and Junior Jazz combos, and Percussion Ensemble.

Notable alumni
 Terry Puhl, former MLB player (Houston Astros, Kansas City Royals)
 Jessica Campbell, Canadian women's ice hockey player for the Calgary Inferno, and formerly a member of the Cornell Big Red
 Damon Severson, Canadian professional ice hockey defenceman playing for the New Jersey Devils in the National Hockey League

References

Schools in Saskatchewan
Educational institutions in Canada with year of establishment missing
Melville, Saskatchewan